Carefree Bus Tours is a private bus company in Essex County, New Jersey. The carrier uses a fleet of coach-style buses for charter services.

References

External links 

Bus transportation in New Jersey
Surface transportation in Greater New York